Kim Jong-Song (born 23 April 1964) is a retired North Korean footballer who played for North Korea at the 1992 AFC Asian Cup. He is the current manager of Gainare Tottori.

Performances in Major International Tournaments
Last update: 29 Nov 2006

Managerial statistics
Update; May 15, 2021

References

External links
 
 

1964 births
Living people
Association football forwards
Association football people from Tokyo
Expatriate footballers in Japan
1992 AFC Asian Cup players
J1 League players
Japan Football League (1992–1998) players
Júbilo Iwata players
Hokkaido Consadole Sapporo players
North Korea international footballers
North Korean expatriate footballers
North Korean expatriate sportspeople in Japan
North Korean footballers
Zainichi Korean people
Asian Games medalists in football
Footballers at the 1990 Asian Games
J2 League managers
J3 League managers
FC Ryukyu managers
Kagoshima United FC managers
Gainare Tottori managers
Asian Games silver medalists for North Korea
Medalists at the 1990 Asian Games
North Korean football managers